Blayney West Macquarie, was a weekly English language newspaper published in Blayney, New South Wales, Australia. The paper incorporated the Blayney Advocate, Blayney Argus and Carcoar Herald.

History 
Blayney West Macquarie commenced publication in the 1930s. It was published weekly by the Blayney Newspaper Company. The paper ceased publication on 23 December 1973, when it was absorbed by the Lyndhurst Shire Chronicle.

Digitisation 
Blayney West Macquarie has been partially digitised as part of the Australian Newspapers Digitisation Program of the National Library of Australia.

See also 
 List of newspapers in New South Wales 
 List of newspapers in Australia

References

External links 
 

Defunct newspapers published in New South Wales
Newspapers on Trove